Tzedek Chicago is a progressive synagogue in Chicago. It is one of the first synagogues in the United States to officially declare itself anti-Zionist.

History
Tzedek Chicago was founded in 2015 in Lincoln Square by the former Reconstructionist Rabbi Brant Rosen as a "non-Zionist" synagogue. The synagogue is dedicated to social justice, universalism, and anti-racism. Many members are Millennials who feel unrepresented elsewhere in the Jewish community.

The synagogue has around 300 members and 200 member families. In March 2022, Tzedek Chicago shifted from non-Zionism to anti-Zionism by declaring anti-Zionism to be a "core value". Rabbi Rosen stated that "Jews have a moral precept of pursuing justice and standing in solidarity with the oppressed", naming anti-Zionism as part of that effort by standing in solidarity with Palestinians. 72% of Tzedek Chicago's membership agreed with the move to declare the congregation anti-Zionist, with the rest of the members choosing to accept the decision and remain part of the congregation. A small number of Jews joined the synagogue after hearing that it was now officially anti-Zionist. Outside of anti-Zionist Hasidic sects such as the Satmar and a handful of "non-Zionist" progressive synagogues, very few synagogues in the United States distance themselves from the Zionist movement. While recognizing the importance of Eretz Israel to Jewish liturgy, tradition, and identity, the synagogue objects to the "fusing of Judaism with political nationalism", "openly acknowledging that the creation of an ethnic Jewish nation state in historic Palestine resulted in an injustice against its indigenous people – an injustice that continues to this day." The decision to become anti-Zionist was highly controversial. Pro-Israel activists harshly criticized Tzedek Israel on social media. Daniel Koren, director of Hasbara Fellowships Canada, said "I don't think they know what Judaism even is." The local Jewish establishment in Chicago shuns Tzedek Israel and they are not listed on the directory of synagogues maintained by Chicago's Jewish United Fund.

References

External links
Tzedek Chicago official website
Why anti-Zionism is a core value of congregation Tzedek Chicago

2015 establishments in Illinois
Anti-racism in the United States
Jewish anti-racism
Jewish anti-Zionism in the United States
Palestinian solidarity movement
North Side, Chicago
Synagogues in Chicago
Unaffiliated synagogues in the United States